is a Japanese-American professional tennis player. He has won one ATP Tour singles title at the 2018 Istanbul Open, seven ATP Challenger Tour singles titles and achieved a career-high singles ranking of world No. 64 on 27 August 2018. He is currently the No. 2 Japanese player.

Personal life
Taro's mother, Yasue, was Japanese and his father, Paul Daniel, is American. He grew up in various places throughout the world. He spent most of his elementary school days in Saitama, Japan. He went to Nagoya International School. Taro and his family moved to Spain when he was 14 years old. He speaks English, Spanish and Japanese. He has one younger sister, Kana.

Tennis career

Early Age
Taro started playing tennis when he was 7 years old. He practiced at the Shinrin Longwood Tennis Club in Nagoya City during his years in Japan. He got third place for under 12 in the All Japan Junior Tennis Tournament.

2011–13
Daniel had won a couple of ITF Futures events in Spain and Portugal. 
On the ATP Challenger Tour, he made the semifinals at the Yokohama in November 2012, and reached his first Challenger final at the Yeongwol in November 2013, where he lost to fourth seed Bradley Klahn in the final. In 2011–2013, Daniel had raised his ATP ranking from world no. 978 to 241.

2014: Grand Slam debut
Daniel reached the third qualifying round of the 2014 Australian Open, losing to Thomaz Bellucci. Qualifying for his first ATP tournament, he made the quarterfinals of the Chile Open, after gaining revenge over Bellucci and defeating eighth seed Federico Delbonis. His run was ended by third seed Nicolas Almagro.

At the 2014 Davis Cup World Group quarterfinal against the Czech Republic, Daniel was nominated for the first time for the Japan Davis Cup team. He played the singles rubber, but lost to Lukáš Rosol in a five-setter and Jiří Veselý. 

Daniel qualified for the 2014 US Open to make his Grand Slam main-draw debut, losing to fifth seed Milos Raonic in the first round. The next week, he reached the final at the Seville Challenger, where he was defeated by top seed Pablo Carreño Busta.

2015: Top 100
After competing in the ATP events of Montpellier and Casablanca, Daniel defeated Filippo Volandri to claim his first ATP Challenger Tour title in Vercelli. He qualified for the 2015 French Open, losing to 32nd seed Fernando Verdasco in the first round. In July, Daniel won the Fürth Challenger, defeating top seeds Blaž Rola and Albert Montañés.

At 2015 Davis Cup World Group Play-offs against Colombia, Daniel won the first Davis Cup match of his career, beating Alejandro Falla in the last tie. His victory completed a come-from-behind victory against Colombia to remain in the World Group for 2016. In October, he qualified for the Valencia Open, and reached the second round, before losing to sixth seed Guillermo García-López. He completed the 2015 season with his third Challenger title in Yokohama, winning over his countryman Go Soeda in the final. He entered the top 100 in the ATP rankings for the first time at world no. 93.

2016: Masters debut and win, Major first win 
Daniel received direct entry to the main draw of the 2016 Australian Open, losing in the first round to Lukáš Rosol in five sets. In February, he reached the second round of the Open Sud de France before losing to eighth seed Marcos Baghdatis in straight sets. At 2016 Davis Cup World Group first round in Birmingham, Japan faced defending champion Great Britain. He was defeated by world No. 2 Andy Murray in straight sets; Japan lost 1–3.

Daniel qualified for the Monte-Carlo Masters to make his ATP World Tour Masters 1000 main-draw debut. He beat Adrian Mannarino in straight sets to reach the second round, where he lost to 12th seed Dominic Thiem in three sets. He then competed at Bucharest and Estoril, reaching the second rounds in both tournaments. In the 2016 French Open, he advanced to the second round of Major tournaments for the first time in his career when his opponent Martin Kližan had to retire from injury in the fifth set. He lost to third seed and defending champion Stan Wawrinka in straight sets despite having two set points in the first set and being up a break in the third. He next competed in the 2016 Wimbledon Championships, losing in the first round to Juan Mónaco in four sets.

Daniel competed in the Olympics, where he defeated the no.14 seed Jack Sock in straight sets in the 1st Round. Daniel then beat Kyle Edmund of Great Britain before losing to Juan Martín del Potro, despite having won the first set.

2017–18: First Masters third round and ATP final, Top 65 debut
Daniel reached second round of the US Open where he lost to Rafael Nadal in four sets.

In March at the Indian Wells Masters, Daniel qualified for the main draw and defeated Cameron Norrie and world No. 13 Novak Djokovic in three sets.

In May, he made his first ATP final at the 2018 Istanbul Open, where he played Tunisian Malek Jaziri, also in his first final. Daniel beat Jaziri 7–6 6–4 to win his first ATP Tournament. Daniel climbed to his career high ranking of No. 64 on 27 August 2018.

2019–20: Out of top 100

2021–22: Grand Slam third round, back to top 100
Daniel, as a lucky loser, reached the semifinals in 2021 Serbia Open in Belgrade, where he beat João Sousa, 7th seed John Millman and Federico Delbonis, but lost to second seed Matteo Berrettini.

After winning through 2022 Australian Open qualifying, Daniel made it to the third round of a Grand Slam for the first time in his career, beating Tomás Barrios and former finalist Andy Murray in the process. He lost to 10th seed Jannik Sinner in the third round.

At the 2022 BNP Paribas Open in Indian Wells in March, having beaten him at Melbourne, Daniel lost to Andy Murray, giving the Scot the 700th match win of his career on the ATP Tour.

Daniel reached the quarterfinals in 2022 Serbia Open in Belgrade, beating Dušan Lajović and Holger Rune. He lost to second seed and eventual champion Andrey Rublev in straight sets.

2023: First Top 10 win, Second Masters third round
Ranked No. 125 at the Mexican Open, Daniel reached the quarterfinals as a qualifier defeating second seed Casper Ruud for his first top 10 win of his career. As a result he moved close to 25 positions up a couple of spots shy of the top 100.

At the 2023 BNP Paribas Open he defeated Roberto Carballes Baena and 20th seed Matteo Berrettini to reach the third round of a Masters as a qualifier for the second time at this tournament and in his career.

ATP career finals

Singles: 1 (1 title)

Challenger and ITF Finals

Singles 25 (11-14)

Doubles: 1 (1 runner-up)

Performance timelines

Singles
Current through the 2023 Australian Open.

Record against top-10 players
Daniel's match record against those who have been ranked in the top 10, with those who have been No. 1 in boldface

  Novak Djokovic 1–0
  Jack Sock 1–0
  David Goffin 1–0
  Casper Ruud  1–0
  Matteo Berrettini 2–3
  Andy Murray 1–2
  Cameron Norrie 1–0
  Marcos Baghdatis 0–1
  Roberto Bautista Agut 0–1
  Marin Čilić 0–1
  Juan Martín del Potro 0–1
  Richard Gasquet 0–1
  Daniil Medvedev 0–1
  Jürgen Melzer 0–1
  Jannik Sinner 0–1
  Juan Mónaco 0–1
  Rafael Nadal 0–1
  Andrey Rublev 0–1
  Denis Shapovalov 0–1
  Gilles Simon 0–1
  Dominic Thiem 0–1
  Janko Tipsarević 0–1
  Stefanos Tsitsipas 0–1
  Jo-Wilfried Tsonga 0–1
  Stan Wawrinka 0–1
  Nicolás Almagro 0–2
  Pablo Carreño Busta 0–2
  Fabio Fognini 0–2
  Milos Raonic 0–2
  Fernando Verdasco 0–2

:* '''

Wins over top 10 players

References

External links
 
 
 

1993 births
Living people
American sportspeople of Japanese descent
Japanese-American tennis players
Japanese male tennis players
Japanese people of American descent
Sportspeople from New York City
Tennis people from New York (state)
Tennis players at the 2016 Summer Olympics
Tennis players at the 2020 Summer Olympics
Olympic tennis players of Japan